Niota is a city in McMinn County, Tennessee, United States. The population was estimated at 772 in 2020 by the U.S. Census Bureau.

History
The community was originally called "Mouse Creek," but was renamed in 1897 to avoid confusion with a railroad stop in Jefferson City that was named "Mossy Creek." The name "Niota" was based on the name of a fictional character in a dime novel, a Native American chief named "Nee-o-tah."

The Niota Depot, built in 1854 for the East Tennessee, Virginia and Georgia Railway, is the oldest standing railroad depot in Tennessee. It currently serves as Niota City Hall.

Geography
Niota is located at  (35.514230, -84.547132). The city is situated along US Route 11 between Sweetwater and Athens. Tennessee State Route 309 connects the city with Interstate 75 to the west.

Demographics

2020 census

As of the 2020 United States census, there were 772 people, 390 households, and 255 families residing in the city.

2000 census
As of the census of 2000, there were 781 people, 344 households, and 231 families residing in the city. The population density was 389.0 people per square mile (150.0/km2). There were 382 housing units at an average density of 190.3 per square mile (73.4/km2). The racial makeup of the city was 91.1% White, 2.04% African American, 1.02% Asian, and 2.34% from two or more races. Hispanic or Latino of any race were 3.16% of the population.

There were 344 households, out of which 29.4% had children under the age of 18 living with them, 54.7% were married couples living together, 7.8% had a female householder with no husband present, and 32.6% were non-families. 29.1% of all households were made up of individuals, and 14.2% had someone living alone who was 65 years of age or older. The average household size was 2.27 and the average family size was 2.76 .

In the city, the population was spread out, with 21.9% under age 18, 7.6% from 18 to 24, 28.7% from 25 to 44, 25.6% from 45 to 64, and 16.3% who were 65 years of age or older. The median age was 40 years. For every 100 females, there were 91.4 males. For every 100 females age 18 and over, there were 88.3 males.

The median income for a household in the city was $28,750, and the median income for a family was $36,136. Males had a median income of $30,119 versus $21,964 for females. The per capita income for the city was $15,152. About 8.6% of families and 12.1% of the population were below the poverty line, including 17.9% of those under age 18 and 10.3% of those age 65 or over.

Education
McMinn County Schools operates public schools, including Niota Elementary School.

Notable people
 Harry T. Burn, member of the Tennessee General Assembly, was born in Niota and lived in the community throughout his life. He is best remembered as the state legislator whose vote secured the ratification of the 19th Amendment to the U.S. Constitution, giving U.S. women the right to vote.
 Alfred Cate, Tennessee state senator and Southern Unionist

References

External links

 
 
  — information on local government, elections, and link to charter

Cities in Tennessee
Cities in McMinn County, Tennessee